Hold That Kiss (1938) is a romantic comedy film starring Maureen O'Sullivan and Dennis O'Keefe.

Plot
Travel agency clerk Tommy Bradford (Dennis O'Keefe) delivers tickets to wealthy J. Westley Piermont (George Barbier) at the lavish wedding of his daughter. Piermont introduces him to model June Evans (Maureen O'Sullivan), but neglects to mention neither one is a guest. June is there to help the daughter with her wedding dress. Both pretend to be rich. Tommy gives June his telephone number, but neither expects anything to come of their momentary attraction to each other.

That night, after she tells her family about her adventure, her obnoxious, younger, musician brother Chick (Mickey Rooney) phones Tommy, pretending to be June's servant, and forces his sister to continue the charade. Tommy is pressured to maintain the masquerade as well by his roommate Al (Edward Brophy), an insurance salesman who dreams of making contacts in New York high society.

They begin seeing each other. Their first date is at the Westminster Dog Show, where they run into Piermont again. He has two dogs entered in the competition. Piermont insists his Pomeranian will win, but Tommy champions his other entry, a St. Bernard. Sure of himself, the millionaire promises to give the St. Bernard to Tommy if it wins. It does, and he does. With no place to keep it, Tommy makes a present of it to June.

Their second date is at a movie theater where another of June's brothers (Phillip Terry) works. By this point, June's family is anxious to meet her boyfriend. Her aunt Lucy (Jessie Ralph) is the housekeeper for a wealthy family, so while her employers are away, she borrows their home to host a dinner. Afterward, Tommy tries to confess to June, but she misunderstands and thinks he has found her out instead. Outraged by what she thinks are insults aimed at her family, she breaks up with him.

Aunt Lucy recognizes Tommy and sets her niece straight. June shows up at Tommy's workplace and gives him a hard time, pretending to be a potential customer. When she leaves, Tommy sees her get into a delivery van with her employer's name on it. Realizing the truth, he goes to her workplace and returns the favor, forcing her to model dress after dress. In the end though, they decide to restart their relationship afresh.

Cast
Maureen O'Sullivan as June Evans
Dennis O'Keefe as Tommy Bradford
Mickey Rooney as Chick Evans
George Barbier as Mr. J. Westley Piermont
Jessie Ralph as Aunt Lucy McCaffey
Edward Brophy as Al (as Edward S. Brophy)
Fay Holden as Mrs. Emily Evans, June's mother
Frank Albertson as Steven Evans, June's brother
Phillip Terry as Ted Evans
Ruth Hussey as Nadine Piermont Kent, Piermont's daughter
Barnett Parker as Maurice, June's couturier employer

External links

1938 films
1938 romantic comedy films
American romantic comedy films
American black-and-white films
Films directed by Edwin L. Marin
Films set in New York City
Metro-Goldwyn-Mayer films
Films scored by Edward Ward (composer)
1930s American films